The Lands Department is a government department under the Development Bureau responsible for all land matters in Hong Kong. Established in 1982, it comprises three functional offices: the Lands Administration Office, the Survey and Mapping Office and the Legal Advisory and Conveyancing Office.

See also
 Hong Kong Guide, an atlas published annually by the Survey and Mapping Office

References

Hong Kong government departments and agencies
Land management
Urban planning in Hong Kong